Machriyeh or Mochriyeh, also rendered as Mojriyeh, may refer to:
 Machriyeh, Dasht-e Azadegan
 Mochriyeh, Shushtar